Aida Fustuq is a Lebanese woman of Palestinian origin who was one of the former wives of King Abdullah, who ruled Saudi Arabia between 2005 and 2015.

Biography
Aida Fustuq hails from Lebanese Sunni family who are of Palestinian origin. She had eight siblings. Her brothers are businessmen, including Mahmoud Fustuq. One of her sisters, Abla Fustuq, was the spouse of Nassib Lahoud, a Lebanese politician.

Aida Fustuq married King Abdullah. Later they divorced. One of her children with King Abdullah is Princess Adila. The other one is Prince Abdulaziz, former assistant foreign minister.

References

Aida
Aida
Lebanese people of Palestinian descent
Lebanese Sunni Muslims
Living people
Aida
Year of birth missing (living people)
Princesses by marriage